São Miguel (English: Saint Michael) is a former parish (freguesia) in the municipality of Lisbon, Portugal. It had a total area of 0.06 km2 and total population of 1,777 inhabitants (2001); density: 30,638 inhabitants/km2. It was created in 1180 near the Castle of São Jorge site. At the administrative reorganization of Lisbon on 8 December 2012 it became part of the parish Santa Maria Maior.

Main sites
São Miguel Church
Santa Luzia Church

References

External links
 São Miguel's parish website

Former parishes of Lisbon